Erna Tauro, née Pergament (16 August 1916 Viipuri4 June 1993 Stockholm), was a Finnish-Swedish pianist and composer.

Biography
Erna Tauro was born in Viipuri, daughter of Isak Pergament and Rifka née Rosenthal, and niece of composers Moses Pergament and Simon Parmet. The family moved to Berlin in 1921 and later to Helsinki. Tauro studied piano and music theory in Berlin, and according to some sources, also studied music at the Sibelius Academy in Finland. During World War II, Tauro worked as a nurse and also an accompanist. From 1955 to 1969 she was principal accompanist at the Little Theater in Helsinki and composed music for a number of plays and musicals.

Her composition "Höstvisa" ("Autumn Song") with lyrics by Tove Jansson won third prize in the 1965 Finnish Broadcasting Song Contest. The same year, she won second place with the song "Den gamla brudkläderskan" ("The Old Bridal Wife") with lyrics by Huldén Evert.

In 1969, Tauro received a position as musical director for Fiddler on the Roof in Stockholm, and in 1977 she settled permanently in that city. She married Risto Ilmari Tauro, and they had one daughter born in 1945. She died in Stockholm in 1993.

Tauro is best known for the songs for Moomin, a series of children's books by Tove Jansson which were translated into plays and animation. Music for the last play, King Moomin Valley, was finished by composer Mika Pohjola after the death of Jansson and Tauro and premiered in August 2008.

Works
Selected works include:

Kahdeksikko, musical
Oli kevät, musical
Guldbröllop, musical
Moomin behind the scenes, songs for a play
Höstvisa
Den gamla brudkläderskan
Troll i kulisserna

References

1916 births
1993 deaths
20th-century classical composers
Finnish music educators
Women classical composers
Jewish classical composers
Finnish classical composers
Swedish classical composers
Finnish Jews
Swedish Jews
Finnish emigrants to Sweden
Swedish people of Finnish-Jewish descent
Swedish women composers
Musicians from Vyborg
People from Viipuri Province (Grand Duchy of Finland)
Women music educators
Finnish women classical composers
20th-century women composers
20th-century Swedish women
20th-century Finnish composers